The Aito M5 is an all-electric/range extender crossover SUV produced by Seres under the Aito brand in collaboration with Huawei from 2022. The model is the first product of a new brand called Aito, which stands for “Adding Intelligence to Auto”.

Overview

The Aito M5 was initially unveiled only as a range extended electric vehicle in December 2021 based on the same platform as the Seres SF5. However, a pure electric variant was unveiled in September 2022. The Aito M5 has a 10.4-inch dashboard display and a 15.6-inch screen on the center console, and is one of the first vehicles to ever utilize the Huawei Harmony OS 3 infotainment system.

The range extended version of the Aito M5  is equipped with a 1.5-litre turbo engine producing  as the range extender with a 56L fuel tank. The Aito M5 can drive a 140km (NEDC) pure electric range on the 40kWh battery. When paired with the range extender, which can produce 3.2kWh/liter, the combined range is 1000km (NEDC).

The Aito M5 rear wheel drive model uses a rear permanent magnet synchronous motor providing a peak power of 200kW and 360Nm of torque. The 4WD model uses a rear motor with 150kW of power and 300Nm or torque and a front induction asynchronous motor with a power of 165kW and 420Nm of torque, giving the car a total peak output of 315kW and 720Nm of torque allowing the vehicle to do a 0-100km/h acceleration in 4.4 seconds.

Aito M5 EV
Unveiled in September 2022, the pure electric M5 EV single motor variant uses a rear positioned motor with rear-wheel-drive and driving range under CLTC is 620km. The four-wheel-drive dual motor driving range under CLTC is 552km.

References

Aito M5
Production electric cars
Hybrid electric cars
Plug-in hybrid vehicles
Cars introduced in 2021
Crossover sport utility vehicles
Rear-wheel-drive vehicles
All-wheel-drive vehicles
Cars of China